Loyalties is a 1933 British drama film directed by Basil Dean and starring Basil Rathbone, Heather Thatcher and Miles Mander. It is based on the 1922 John Galsworthy play Loyalties.

The film addresses the theme of anti-Semitism. The film was part of an increased trend depicting mistreatment of Jews in British films during the 1930s, tied to the rising tide of anti-Semitism in Nazi Germany, but is unusual in its depiction of prejudice in Britain as most other films were set in a non-British, historical context.

Plot
While a houseguest at an upper-class gathering, the wealthy Jew Ferdinand de Levis is robbed of nearly £1,000 with evidence pointing towards the guilt of another guest, Captain Dancy. Instead of supporting De Levis, the host attempts to hush the matter up and then sides with Dancy and subtly tries to destroy de Levis's reputation. When Dancy is later exposed and commits suicide, de Levis is blamed for his demise.

Cast
 Basil Rathbone as Ferdinand de Levis
 Heather Thatcher as Margaret Orme
 Miles Mander as Captain Ronald Dancy, DSO
 Joan Wyndham as Mabel, Mrs. Borring
 Philip Strange as Major Colford
 Alan Napier as General Canynge
 Cecily Byrne as Lady Adela
 Athole Stewart as Lord St. Erth
 Patric Curwen as Sir Fredric Blair
 Marcus Barron as The Lord Chief Justice
 Ben Field as Gilman
 Griffith Humphreys as Inspector Jones
 Robert Coote as Robert
 Aubrey Dexter as Kentman
 Laurence Hanray as Jacob Twisden
 Stafford Hilliard as Treisure
 Anthony Holles as Ricardos
 Mike Johnson as Jenkins
 Arnold Lucy as Googie
 Don MacKay as Mike Sawchuck
 Robert Mawdesley as Edward Graviter
 Maxine Sandra as Ricardo's Daughter
 Patrick Waddington as Augustus Borring
 Algernon West as Charles Winsor

Production
Film rights were purchased by Herbert Wilcox for £9,000. He developed a screenplay for an extra £2,000. Galsworthy had contractual rights of approval over the project. Wilcox sold the project to William Fox for £20,000.

The film was the first to be made by Associated Talking Pictures (which later became Ealing Studios), after the breakdown of their arrangement with RKO Pictures. Carol Reed and Thorold Dickinson both worked on the film's production as assistant directors. Edward Carrick designed the film's sets.

References

Bibliography
 Low, Rachel. History of British Film: Volume VII, 1929-1939. Routledge, 1997
 Robertson, James C. The British Board of Film Censors: film censorship in Britain, 1896-1950. Croom Helm, 1985.

External links

Films based on works by John Galsworthy
1933 films
1933 drama films
British drama films
British legal films
Films about Jews and Judaism
British films based on plays
Films directed by Basil Dean
Films set in England
Films about race and ethnicity
Associated Talking Pictures
British black-and-white films
1930s English-language films
1930s British films